The Diocese of Africa was a diocese of the later Roman Empire, incorporating the provinces of North Africa, except Mauretania Tingitana. Its seat was at Carthage, and it was subordinate to the Praetorian prefecture of Italy.

The diocese included the provinces of Africa proconsularis (also known as Zeugitana), Byzacena, Mauretania Sitifensis, Mauretania Caesariensis, Numidia Cirtensis, Numidia Militiana and Tripolitania. In current geo-political terms, the Diocese of Africa included the entire coastline of Tunisia, Algeria with some mountainous hinterlands, plus the western half of Libya's coastline.

The diocese existed from the time of the Diocletianian and Constantinian reforms in the last years of the 3rd century until it was overrun by the Vandals in the 430s. The provincial organization were retained under the Vandals, and after their defeat and the reconquest of Africa by the Eastern Roman Empire in the Vandalic War, they were grouped anew, but this time in a praetorian prefecture.

References

Sources 

 

314 establishments
States and territories established in the 310s
Africa
History of Christianity in North Africa
Africa (Roman province)
Ancient Algeria
Praetorian prefecture of Italy